Damgan (Damgan in Breton) is a commune in the Morbihan department of Brittany in north-western France. Inhabitants of Damgan are called in French Damganais.

Geography
 
Damgan  is a coastal town located on the south coast of Brittany. The river Penerf forms a natural boundary to the west. Historically Damgan belongs to Vannetais and Lower Brittany.

Neighboring places

Map

Population

Tourism

Damgan is a seaside resort. It is a destination very popular in summer. 74.1 % of the properties are holiday homes, the highest percentage in Morbihan.

See also
Communes of the Morbihan department

References

External links

 Mayors of Morbihan Association 

Communes of Morbihan